Jóhannes Sandhólm Atlason (born 7 September 1944) is an Icelandic football manager and former player. He played as a defender for Fram Reykjavík from 1964 to 1972 and ÍBA Akureyri in 1973. He managed the Icelandic national team from 1982 to 1983, and ÍB Vestmannaeyja in 1993.

References

1944 births
Living people
Johannes Atlason
Johannes Atlason
Johannes Atlason
Johannes Atlason
Johannes Atlason
Johannes Atlason
Johannes Atlason

Association football defenders
Stjarnan football managers